Dimitre Ganev Kalkanov (born 5 April 1966) is a Bulgarian former professional footballer who played as a defender or defensive midfielder.

Career
Kalkanov started his career with Lokomotiv Plovdiv. He took part in the 1985 FIFA World Youth Championship with Bulgaria, making three appearances in that tournament. Kalkanov then played in Hong Kong for Instant-Dict and Happy Valley, and in Malaysia for Selangor and Kelantan. While in Hong Kong, Kalkanov won the Hong Kong Footballer of the Year award in 1998, becoming the first non-Hong Konger to win the award. He played for the Hong Kong League XI at the 1998 Dynasty Cup, 2000 Guangdong–Hong Kong Cup and the Carlsberg Cup in 2000 and 2001.
In 1998, he also made an appearance as part of the Hong Kong League XI against the Bulgarian national football team in a friendly match.

References

1966 births
Living people
Bulgarian footballers
Bulgaria youth international footballers
Bulgarian expatriate footballers
PFC Lokomotiv Plovdiv players
First Professional Football League (Bulgaria) players
Expatriate footballers in Hong Kong
Expatriate footballers in Malaysia
Bulgarian expatriate sportspeople in Hong Kong
Bulgarian expatriate sportspeople in Malaysia
Kelantan FA players
Selangor FA players
Double Flower FA players
Happy Valley AA players
Association football defenders
Association football midfielders
Hong Kong League XI representative players